Southwest Airlines Co., typically referred to as Southwest, is an airline based in the United States and the world's largest low-cost carrier. It is headquartered in Dallas, Texas, and has scheduled service to 121 destinations in the United States and 10 additional countries. , Southwest carried more domestic passengers than any other United States airline.

The airline was established on March 9, 1967, by Herb Kelleher and Rollin King as Air Southwest Co. and adopted its current name, Southwest Airlines Co., in 1971, when it began operating as an intrastate airline wholly within the state of Texas, first flying between Dallas, Houston, and San Antonio. It began regional interstate service in 1979, expanding nationwide in the following decades. Southwest currently serves airports in 42 states and multiple Central American destinations.

Southwest's business model is distinct from other US airlines as it uses a rolling hub and point-to-point network and allows free checked baggage. It exclusively uses Boeing 737 jets in its fleet.

The airline has nearly 66,100 employees and operates about 4,000 departures a day during peak travel season.

History 

Southwest Airlines was founded in 1966 by Herbert Kelleher and Rollin King, and in 1967 it was incorporated as Air Southwest Co. Three other airlines took legal action to try to prevent the company from its planned strategy of undercutting their prices by flying only within Texas and thus being exempt from various regulations. The lawsuits were resolved in 1970, and in 1971 the airline began operating regularly scheduled flights between Dallas Love Field and Houston and between Love Field and San Antonio, and adopted the name Southwest Airlines Co. In 1975, Southwest began operating flights to various additional cities within Texas, and in 1979 it began flying to adjacent states. Service to the East and the Southeast started in the 1990s. Southwest turned a profit for 47 consecutive fiscal years from 1973 through 2019.

Destinations 

, Southwest scheduled flights to over 100 destinations in 42 states, Puerto Rico, Mexico, Central America, and the Caribbean. Southwest does not use the traditional hub-and-spoke system of other major airlines, preferring a point-to-point system combined with a rolling-hub model in its base cities.

Fleet 

, Southwest Airlines operates 771 aircraft. In its history, Southwest Airlines has operated only Boeing 737 jetliners, except from 1979 to 1980 and 1983 to 1985, when it leased and operated a few Boeing 727-200s. Southwest is the largest operator of the Boeing 737 worldwide. Using a single basic aircraft type allows Southwest pilots and flight attendants to crew any aircraft in the fleet without restrictions.

In March 2021, Southwest announced an order for 100 MAX 7 jets. The order established Southwest Airlines as the largest purchaser of the Boeing jet model. In June 2021, they increased their overall purchase order of Max 7 planes to 234 jets in total.

Passenger experience

Southwest solely offers economy-class seats, and does not have business- or first-class cabins on its aircraft. Still, Southwest does offer many amenities, as follows:

The company permits two free-of-charge checked bags per passenger, and passengers are permitted to change their flight up to 10 minutes prior to their flights without extra charge. In the event of a cancellation, passengers are refunded a travel credit in the amount spent on their ticket, and the credit may be used toward other Southwest Airlines or Southwest Vacations purchase. The credit does not expire.

Southwest offers free in-flight nonalcoholic beverages and offers alcoholic beverages for sale for $6 to $7 per beverage. Free alcoholic drinks are offered on some holidays such as Valentine's Day and Halloween. They also have complimentary snacks on all flights. Southwest has become known for colorful boarding announcements and crews who sometimes burst out in song.

Prior to 2007, Southwest boarded passengers by grouping the passengers into three groups, labeled A, B and C. Passengers would line up at their specified letter and board.

In 2007, Southwest modified its boarding procedure by introducing a number. Each passenger receives a letter (A, B, or C) and a number 1 through 60. Passengers line up in numerical order within each letter group and choose any open seat on the aircraft. A 2012 study on the television series MythBusters, found this to be the fastest method currently in use for passengers to board a plane; on average, it is 10 minutes faster than the standard method. The airline was also number-one on the 2020 Airline Quality Rating list.

Southwest has a "customer of size" policy in which the cost of a second seat is refunded for any plus-sized travelers who take up more room than one seat.

In-flight entertainment
Wi-Fi now costs $8, that allows for streaming live television, movies, streaming music, and app messaging. After completing a testing phase that began in February 2009, Southwest announced on August 21, 2009, that it would begin rolling out in-flight Wi-Fi Internet connectivity via Global Eagle Entertainment's satellite-broadband-based product. Southwest began adding Wi-Fi to its aircraft in the first quarter of 2010. The airline began testing streaming live television in the summer of 2012 and video on demand in January 2013. As of November 1, 2018, live in-flight TV, movies, messaging (iMessage and WhatsApp) and real-time flight-tracking information via Wi-Fi became available to passengers, with full Internet access available at a fee for regular passengers.

Rapid Rewards
Southwest first began to offer a frequent-flyer program on June 18, 1987, calling it The Company Club. The program credited for trips flown regardless of distance. Southwest Airlines renamed its frequent flyer program Rapid Rewards on April 25, 1996.

The original Rapid Rewards program offered one credit per one-way flight from an origin to a destination, including any stops or connections on Southwest Airlines. When 16 credits were accumulated in a 24-month period, Southwest awarded one free round-trip ticket that was valid for 12 months.

On March 1, 2011, Rapid Rewards changed to a points system based on ticket cost. Members earn and redeem points based on a four-tier fare scale multiplier and the cost of the ticket. Changes also included no blackout dates, seat restrictions, or expiring credits. Since October 18, 2019, Rapid Rewards points do not expire as long as the member is alive. It also adds more options to use points.

Corporate affairs

Headquarters 

The Southwest Airlines headquarters are located on the grounds of Dallas Love Field in the Love Field neighborhood of Dallas. Chris Sloan of Airways magazine stated they are "as much a living, breathing museum and showcase for the 'culture that LUV built' as they are corporate offices."

On September 17, 2012, Southwest broke ground on a new Training and Operational Support building, across the street from its current headquarters building. The property includes a two-story, 100,000-square-foot Network Operations Control building that can withstand an EF3 tornado. It also includes a four-story, 392,000-square-foot office, and training facility with two levels devoted to each function. The new facilities house 24-hour coordination and maintenance operations, customer support and services, and training. The project was completed in late 2013, with occupancy beginning in 2014.

On June 2, 2016, Southwest broke ground on its new office and training facility known as Wings. The newest addition to the corporate campus is composed of a 420,000-square-foot, six-story office building, and a 380,000-square-foot adjoining structure called the Leadership Education and Aircrew Development (LEAD) Center that serves as the new pilot training facility. The LEAD Center has the capacity to house and support 18 flight simulators. It is designed to be expanded to accommodate up to 26 simulator bays. The building opened on April 3, 2018.

On August 16, 2019, Southwest announced an expansion of the LEAD Center to accommodate eight additional simulators for future operational and training demands. On January 2, 2020, it was announced that Southwest would be purchasing an additional  of land adjacent to its Wings and LEAD facilities. No additional details were disclosed.

Employment 
, Southwest Airlines had 62,333 active full-time equivalent employees. According to The Washington Post, it uses the hiring motto of seeking people that have a "Servant's Heart, Warrior Spirit, Fun-LUVing Attitude". It also uses the internal practice of ranking "employees first, customers second".

Bob Jordan, formerly executive vice president of corporate services, became Southwest's sixth CEO on February 1, 2022, replacing Gary C. Kelly. Kelly continues as chairman of Southwest Airlines. Kelly replaced former CEO Jim Parker on July 15, 2004, and assumed the title of president on July 15, 2008, replacing former president Colleen Barrett. In July 2008, Herb Kelleher resigned from his position as chairman. Barrett left her post on the board of directors and as a corporate secretary in May 2008 and as president in July 2008. Kelleher was president and CEO of Southwest from September 1981 to June 2001. On June 23, 2021, Southwest announced that chairman and CEO Gary Kelly would transition roles in early 2022, becoming the carrier's executive chairman with the desire to serve in that role through at least 2026 at the discretion of the board of directors. Jordan also joined the board then.

On January 10, 2017, Southwest announced changes to the company's executive leadership ranks, with Thomas M. Nealon named as president and Michael G. Van de Ven as the airline's chief operating officer. On September 14, 2021, Southwest announced Nealon had decided to retire from his duties as president effective immediately, but would continue to serve the company as a strategic advisor. Chief Operating Officer Mike Van de Ven was named as the company's president the same day, and remains COO.

About 83% of Southwest employees are members of a union. The Southwest Airline Pilots' Association, a union not affiliated with the Air Line Pilots Association, represents the airline's pilots. The aircraft maintenance technicians are represented by the Aircraft Mechanics Fraternal Association. Customer service agents and reservation agents are represented by the International Association of Machinists and Aerospace Workers Union. Flight dispatchers, flight attendants, ramp agents, and operations agents are represented by the Transport Workers Union. 

The company has appeared on various "best places to work" list, with its employee culture mentioned by Travel and Leisure, CNBC, and Forbes. The company has also been named to Fortune magazine's "Most Admired Companies" list, reaching number 14 in 2021.

Southwest has never furloughed an employee. As a result of the COVID-19 pandemic, the company launched voluntary separation and extended time-off programs in 2020, and around 16,900 employees volunteered to take an early retirement or long-term leave.  Roughly 24% were pilots and 33% were flight attendants. In late 2020, the airline issued some WARN Act notices and announced incipient pay cuts for many employees in response to pandemic impacts, but these measures were rescinded after the Consolidated Appropriations Act, 2021 was enacted on December 27, 2020, providing additional financial aid to US airlines.

Impact on carriers 
Southwest and its business model have had an influence on other low-cost carriers (LCC's). The competitive strategy combines a high level of employee and aircraft productivity with low unit costs by reducing aircraft turnaround time, particularly at the gate. Europe's EasyJet and Ryanair are two of the best-known airlines to follow Southwest's business strategy in that continent. Other airlines with a business model based on Southwest's system include Canada's WestJet, Malaysia's AirAsia (the first and biggest LCC in Asia), India's IndiGo, Australia's Jetstar, a subsidiary of Qantas (although Jetstar now operates three aircraft types), Philippines's Cebu Pacific, Thailand's Nok Air, Mexico's Volaris, Indonesia's Lion Air and Turkey's Pegasus Airlines.

Lobbying against high-speed rail 
Southwest Airlines has a history of lobbying against high-speed rail, which it sees as a competitor for short-distance commuter flights. In the early 1990s, Southwest lobbied U.S. Congress and the Texas Legislature to oppose a high-speed rail system between Dallas, San Antonio, and Houston, and filed three lawsuits against the initiative. In 1991, Southwest told Texas authorities, "Rail has a romantic appeal, but this case cannot be decided on the basis of nostalgia or even a desire to emulate the rail service of France and Germany. The American reality is that high-speed rail will be viable in Texas only by destroying the convenient and inexpensive transportation service the airlines now provide, and only by absorbing huge public subsidies." In 1994, the high-speed rail initiative was cancelled. While several reasons led to the initiative's demise, most commentators attribute a key role to Southwest Airlines' aggressive campaign against it.

Advertising 
The company has always employed humor in its advertising. Former slogans include "Love Is Still Our Field", "Just Plane Smart", "The Somebody Else Up There Who Loves You", "You're Now Free to Move About the Country", "THE Low Fare Airline", "Grab your bag, It's On!", and "Welcome Aboard". The airline's slogan (as of 2022) is "Low fares. Nothing to hide. That's TransFarency!"

In March 1992, shortly after Southwest started using the "Just Plane Smart" motto, Stevens Aviation, which had been using "Plane Smart" for its motto, advised Southwest that it was infringing on its trademark.  Instead of a lawsuit, the CEOs for both companies staged an arm-wrestling match. Held at the now-demolished Dallas Sportatorium and set for two out of three rounds, the loser of each round was to pay $5,000 to the charity of his choice, with the winner gaining the use of the trademarked phrase. A promotional video was created showing the CEOs "training" for the bout (with CEO Herb Kelleher being helped up during a sit-up where a cigarette and glass of Wild Turkey 101 whiskey was waiting) and distributed among the employees and also as a video press release along with the video of the match itself. Herb Kelleher lost the match for Southwest, with Stevens Aviation winning the rights to the phrase. Kurt Herwald, CEO of Stevens Aviation, immediately granted the use of "Just Plane Smart" to Southwest Airlines. The net result was both companies having use of the trademark.

Accidents and incidents
Southwest Airlines accidents and incidents include four deaths: one accidental passenger death in flight, two nonpassenger deaths on the ground, and one passenger death from injuries he sustained when subdued by other passengers while attempting to break into the cockpit of an aircraft.

Southwest has had nine accidents, including two aircraft hull losses. The airline was considered among the 10 safest airlines in the world in 2012.

Controversies and passenger incidents

On June 22, 2011, a March 25 recording was released to the press of an apparently inadvertent in-flight radio transmission of Southwest captain James Taylor conversing with his first officer. The conversation was peppered with obscenities directed at gay, overweight, and older flight attendants. According to Southwest, the pilot was reprimanded and temporarily suspended without pay and received diversity education before being reinstated.

On September 26, 2017, a woman was removed from a Southwest flight after claiming to have a life-threatening allergy to dogs, two of which were present on the aircraft, one being a certified service animal. Southwest employees requested that she provide documentation of her condition and staff asked her to exit the aircraft multiple times and police ultimately had to escort her away. 

On December 29, 2017, a family was removed from a flight from Chicago Midway Airport because of an unconfirmed head lice accusation. The family did not have lice and was re-accommodated on a flight two days later.

In October 2019, a Southwest flight attendant filed a lawsuit against the airline, claiming that two pilots had livestreamed footage from a camera hidden in the plane's toilet to an iPad, and that one of the pilots said that such cameras were a "top-secret security measure" installed in all of the airline's 737-800 aircraft. Southwest and the pilot union stated that the film was a hoax and a "poor attempt at humor" by one of the pilots, previously recorded of himself on a different aircraft, fully clothed. 

In February 2020, a report conducted by the DOT inspector general found that Southwest was flying airplanes with safety concerns and that the Federal Aviation Administration was failing to properly oversee the airline.

In 2020, a captain of a Southwest flight watched pornography on a laptop computer with his clothes removed while his female first officer continued her duties. The captain retired before the incident was reported, but he was subsequently prosecuted for lewd behavior, and the airline terminated his retirement benefits. 

On May 23, 2021, a female passenger aboard a Southwest flight repeatedly punched a female flight attendant in the face after landing at San Diego International Airport, causing the attendant to lose two teeth. The passenger was subsequently charged with battery causing serious bodily injury.

Citing four whistleblowers, federal investigators with the U.S. Office of Special Counsel released a report on July 27, 2022, that follows up on the 2020 DOT inspector general's report. The 2022 report claims that Southwest stonewalled Federal Aviation Administration (FAA) investigations into maintenance and piloting safety lapses, and criticized the FAA for failing to adequately oversee the airline, stating that senior FAA staff "mismanaged and interfered" with investigations "in the face of SWA's intimidation tactics". The report accuses Southwest of misusing the FAA's Aviation Safety Action Program (ASAP) to hide pilot errors, while accusing the FAA of failing to adequately oversee Southwest's mechanics, and of failing to adequately vet maintenance records provided by the airline for 49 737 aircraft purchased from foreign carriers whose documentation practices did not meet FAA standards.

December 2022 scheduling crisis

The airline experienced severe delays and thousands of flight cancellations starting on December 21, 2022, and continuing through the Christmas holiday. While some cancellations were due to bad weather from the severe late December winter storm across much of the United States, industry experts and SWAPA also blamed inadequate staffing and the airline's "outdated" employee scheduling system, citing reports of pilots waiting on hold on the telephone for up to eight hours awaiting work assignments. On December 26, the airline initiated a massive system "reset", preemptively canceling thousands of flights and halting ticket sales over concerns that travelers might buy tickets for flights that are subsequently canceled. Federal officials criticized the airline and U.S. Department of Transportation Secretary Pete Buttigieg announced a formal investigation. Some experts attributed the crisis to the lack of scheduling flexibility inherent in the airline's point-to-point operations model. Paul Krugman in The New York Times suggested the turmoil was not as much about corporate greed as some might expect and noted that despite an increasingly digitalized world, "there's a lot of physical action, and real-world labor, going on behind the scenes." Another writer on the paper's opinion pages, Elizabeth Spiers, said this was an example of the airlines knowing they are offering passengers a poor deal but that many people have little choice given the alternatives. The airline said it expected the problems to hurt its Q4 2022 financial results.

See also
 Air transportation in the United States
 Southwest Airlines State Fair Classic
 Southwest Effect
 Transportation in the United States
 Nuts!

References

External links

 
 
 
 Southwest Airline Pilots' Association 
 Southwest Airlines Seating Charts on SeatGuru.com
 Southwest Airlines Fleet Age

 Southwest Airlines' Yahoo! Finance Profile
 StartupStudio – Interview with Herb Kelleher on the founding of Southwest Airlines, recommendations for entrepreneurs and rule of thumb for raising venture funding

 
Companies listed on the New York Stock Exchange
Airlines based in Texas
Airlines established in 1967
Low-cost carriers
Airlines for America members
Companies based in Dallas
Companies in the Dow Jones Transportation Average
1967 establishments in Texas
American companies established in 1967